Elzéar Emmanuel Arène Abeille de Perrin (3 January 1843, Marseille – 9 October 1910, Marseille)
was a French entomologist.

Abeille de Perrin was a lawyer in Marseille. He gave all his free time to entomology and was a member of the 
Société entomologique de France for twenty years. He was especially interested in the cave species of the 
Pyrenees. His best known publications are Monographie des malachites (1869), Études sur les coléoptères cavernicoles, suivies de la description de 27 coléoptères nouveaux français (1872), Notes sur les leptodirites
(1878), and Synopsis critique et synonymique des chrysides de France (1878).

His collection of Palearctic, Coleoptera, Hymenoptera, Diptera, and Orthoptera is conserved 
in Muséum national d'histoire naturelle in Paris.

References
Ancey, F. 1910 [Abeille de Perrin, E.] Ann. Soc. Hist. Nat. Toulon  97–98, Portrait.
Buysson, H. du 1925 [Abeille de Perrin, E.]  Misc. Entomol. 28(12) 92.
Caillol, H. 1911 [Abeille de Perrin, E.] Ann. Soc. Ent. Fr. 80: 492–502 
Constantin, R. 1992 Memorial des Coléopteristes Francaise. Bull. liaison Assoc. Col. reg. parisienne, Paris (Suppl. 14) : 1–92 7, Portrait.
Gouillard, J. 1991 Biography in Hist. Entomologistes francais  14 
Lhoste, J. 1987 Les entomologistes français. 1750–1950. INRA (Institut National de la Recherche Agronomique), Paris : 1–355.
Pic, M. 1942 [Abeille de Perrin, E.]  Mon Jub. ent., Echange (H. S.)  31–32.
Semenov-Tjan-Schanskij, A. P. 1912 [Abeille de Perrin, E.]  Revue Russe d'Entomologie 12 635–636.
Seurat, L. G. 1930: [Abeille de Perrin, E.] Explor. zool. Algérie''  686.

Notes

1843 births
1910 deaths
French entomologists
Hymenopterists